McRoy is a surname. Notable people with the surname include:

Bob McRoy (died 1917), American baseball executive
Elwyn McRoy, American college basketball coach
Jason McRoy (1971–1995), English mountain bike racer
Spike McRoy (born 1968), American golfer

See also
McCoy (surname)